Times-News may refer to:

 Times-News (Idaho), a newspaper published in Twin Falls, Idaho
 Times-News (Burlington, North Carolina), a newspaper published in Burlington, North Carolina
 Times-News (Hendersonville, North Carolina), a newspaper published in Hendersonville, North Carolina
 Times News (Pennsylvania), a newspaper published in Lehighton, Pennsylvania
 The Times-News (Utah), a newspaper published in Nephi, Utah
 Cumberland Times-News, a newspaper published in Cumberland, Maryland
 Erie Times-News, a newspaper published in Erie, Pennsylvania
 Kingsport Times-News, a newspaper published in Kingsport, Tennessee